Thomas Millet Hand (July 7, 1902 in Cape May, New Jersey – December 26, 1956 in Cold Spring, New Jersey) was an American Republican Party politician who represented New Jersey's 2nd congressional district in the United States House of Representatives from 1945 to 1956.

Early life and education
Hand was born in Cape May, New Jersey on July 7, 1902, and attended the local public schools. He graduated in 1922 from the Dickinson School of Law, in Carlisle, Pennsylvania, was admitted to the New Jersey Bar Association in 1924 and commenced practice in Cape May.

Political and business career
He was clerk of the Cape May County, New Jersey Board of Chosen Freeholders from 1924 to 1928, and the prosecutor of the pleas of Cape May County from 1928 to 1933. Hand served as the Mayor of Cape May from 1937 to 1944, and was the publisher of the Cape May Star and Wave from 1940 until his death. He was also a partner in the Mecray-Hand Co., a real estate and insurance business.

Congress
Hand was elected as a Republican to the Seventy-ninth and to the five succeeding Congresses and had been reelected on November 6, 1956, to the Eighty-fifth Congress. He served in the House from January 3, 1945, until his death.

Death
Hand died of a heart attack at his home in the Cold Spring section of Lower Township, New Jersey on December 26, 1956.

His remains were cremated at Ewing Cemetery in Trenton, New Jersey and interred in Cold Spring Presbyterian Cemetery in Cold Spring, New Jersey.

See also
 List of United States Congress members who died in office (1950–99)

Notes

References

External links

Thomas Millet Hand at The Political Graveyard

1902 births
1956 deaths
People from Cape May, New Jersey
People from Lower Township, New Jersey
Dickinson School of Law alumni
Mayors of places in New Jersey
New Jersey lawyers
Republican Party members of the United States House of Representatives from New Jersey
20th-century American politicians
Burials at Cold Spring Presbyterian Church
20th-century American lawyers